Phenylalanyl-tRNA synthetase beta chain is an enzyme that in humans is encoded by the FARSB gene.

This gene encodes a highly conserved enzyme that belongs to the aminoacyl-tRNA synthetase class IIc subfamily. This enzyme comprises the regulatory beta subunits that form a tetramer with two catalytic alpha subunits. In the presence of ATP, this tetramer is responsible for attaching L-phenylalanine to the terminal adenosine of the appropriate tRNA. A pseudogene located on chromosome 10 has been identified.

References

Further reading

External links